Gutić is a Serbian and Croatian surname. It may refer to:

Viktor Gutić, Ustaše commissioner
Mirko Gutić, Yugoslav author
Ismar Gutić, Bosnian politician
Jovan Gutić, leader of the Herzegovina Uprising (1875–78)
Ante Gutić, mayor of Civljane, Croatia

Croatian surnames
Serbian surnames